Gabriel Souza da Silva (born 5 January 2005), known as Gabriel or simply GB, is a Brazilian footballer who plays as a forward for Vasco da Gama.

Club career
Born in Rio de Janeiro, GB started playing futsal with local side River de Piedade, before being spotted by professional team Vasco da Gama, having played in a game against them. He joined Vasco da Gama at the age of nine, and progressed through their academy, signing a professional contract in 2021.

Career statistics

Club

References

2005 births
Living people
Footballers from Rio de Janeiro (city)
Brazilian footballers
Association football forwards
CR Vasco da Gama players